Singatalur is a village in the Mundargi taluk of Gadag district in the Indian state of Karnataka. Singatalur is located south to district headquarters Gadag and Taluka headquarters Mundargi.

Demographics
Per the 2011 Census of India, has a total population of 3069; of whom 1577 are male and 1492 female.

Importance
Singatalur is famous for the ancient Veerabhadra Temple located in the river side of Thungabhadra River.

Singatalur lift irrigation project
Singatalur Lift Irrigation Project on Tungabhadra river is aimed to irrigate .

See also
Hammigi
Korlahalli
Mundargi
Gadag
Koppal
Siranahalli
Gangapur
Kombali

References

External links
www.gadag.nic.in

Villages in Gadag district